Saint Gemellus of Ancyra is venerated as a Christian martyr and saint.  According to tradition, he was martyred by crucifixion at Ancyra (present-day Ankara), in Asia Minor, during the reign of Julian the Apostate.  

He was a native of Paphlagonia.

He is said to be the last Christian martyr who was killed by crucifixion.  Hearing that the Emperor Julian was at Ancyra, Gemellus had traveled there to criticize the emperor for his apostasy, and was tortured and killed at Ancyra (or, according to one source, at Edessa).
 
A church dedicated to Saint Gemellus was located at Sykeon, a village on the Siberis River in Asia Minor.

References

4th-century Christian martyrs
362 deaths
Year of birth unknown